Loubillé is a commune in the Deux-Sèvres department in western France.

Loubillé has few shops or commerce and is a mainly residential village. The closest main town is Chef-Boutonne some 10 km to the north.

See also
Communes of the Deux-Sèvres department

References

Communes of Deux-Sèvres